Herbert Mackworth (7 September 1687 – 20 August 1765) was a Welsh landowner, coal owner and Tory politician who sat in the House of Commons from 1739 to 1765.

Early life

Mackworth was the son of Sir Humphrey Mackworth of Gnoll, Glamorganshire, MP for Cardiganshire, and his wife Mary Evans, daughter of Sir Herbert Evans of Gnoll. His brother was William Mackworth Praed. He was educated at Westminster School and matriculated at Magdalen College, Oxford, in 1704. He was admitted at Inner Temple in 1708. On his father's death in 1727 he inherited the Gnoll estate and substantial coal mining and copper smelting interests in the Neath valley. He married Juliana Digby, the daughter of William Digby, 5th Baron Digby on 24 April 1730.

Career
Mackworth was returned unopposed as Tory Member of Parliament for  Cardiff Boroughs on his own and the Windsor interest at a by-election on 16 February 1739. He always voted   against the Administration, except when he was one of the Tories who voted against the motion for Walpole's removal in February 1741. He was returned unopposed again in 1741 and 1747.

Mackworth was returned unopposed as MP for Cardiff at the 1754 British general election and the  1761 British general election. He supported the Grenville administration and was an opponent of Rockingham. He is not recorded as ever having spoken in parliament.

Death and legacy
Mackworth died on 20 August 1765, leaving a son and six daughters. His son, also Herbert, followed him as MP for Cardiff and was created a baronet in 1776. His daughter Susanna married Sir John Hotham, 9th Baronet, Bishop of Clogher.

Mackworth's daughter Frances married firstly Alexander, 5th Lord Falconer of Halkerton, secondly Anthony Browne, 7th Viscount Montagu, and thirdly Henry Slaughter M.D., all three weddings taking place at St George's, Hanover Square.

References

 

1687 births
1765 deaths
People from Neath
People educated at Westminster School, London
Alumni of Magdalen College, Oxford
Members of the Inner Temple
Welsh industrialists
Members of the Parliament of Great Britain for Welsh constituencies
British MPs 1734–1741
British MPs 1741–1747
British MPs 1747–1754
British MPs 1754–1761
British MPs 1761–1768